Nematocida is a genus of Microsporidia fungi. One species, N. parisii, is found in wild isolates of Caenorhabditis elegans. It has been nicknamed the nematode-killer from Paris. This species replicates in the intestines of C. elegans.

Nematode cuticle
is a cuticle that includes fibers such as keratin, collagen, and some that run around in opposite directions from each other. This has a flexible extracellular exoskeleton structure that has many layers, (but is very stiff) and that has a barrier that helps prevent nematodes from natural and ecological harm that may happen. These may have powerful agents that are used to recognize, attach, penetrate and kill theses parasitic nematodes.

References

External links 
 

Microsporidia genera
Parasites of animals
Caenorhabditis elegans